Group B of the 2007 Fed Cup Americas Zone Group II was one of two pools in the Americas Zone Group II of the 2007 Fed Cup. Five teams competed in a round robin competition, with the teams proceeding to their respective sections of the play-offs: the top two teams played for advancement to the 2008 Group I.

Bolivia vs. Barbados

Paraguay vs. Guatemala

Bolivia vs. Paraguay

Guatemala vs. Trinidad and Tobago

Bolivia vs. Trinidad and Tobago

Paraguay vs. Barbados

Paraguay vs. Trinidad and Tobago

Guatemala vs. Barbados

Bolivia vs. Guatemala

Trinidad and Tobago vs. Barbados

See also
Fed Cup structure

References

External links
 Fed Cup website

2007 Fed Cup Americas Zone